James Ogilvy-Grant, 9th Earl of Seafield (27 December 1817 – 5 June 1888), known for most of his life as the Hon. James Ogilvy-Grant, was a Scottish peer and Conservative Member of Parliament (MP).

Seafield was the fourth son of Francis William Ogilvy-Grant, 6th Earl of Seafield, and Mary Anne Dunn. He achieved the rank of lieutenant colonel in the army. At the 1868 general election he was elected to the House of Commons as MP for Elginshire and Nairnshire as a Conservative, a seat he held until his defeat at the 1874 general election. In 1884 he succeeded his nephew as ninth Earl of Seafield. A few months later he was created Baron Strathspey, of Strathspey in the Counties of Inverness and Moray, in the Peerage of the United Kingdom. This title, a revival of the barony created for his elder brother in 1858, gave him an automatic seat in the House of Lords.

Lord Seafield was married three times. He married firstly Caroline Louisa, daughter of Eyre Evans, in 1841. After his first wife's death in 1850 he married secondly Constance Helena, daughter of Sir Robert Abercromby, 5th Baronet, in 1853. She died in 1872 and Seafield married thirdly Georgina Adelaide, daughter of Frederick Nathaniel Walker. Lord Seafield died in June 1888, aged 70, and was succeeded by his eldest son from his first marriage, Francis William Ogilvy-Grant.

Lord Seafield is buried at the mausoleum at Duthil Old Parish Church and Churchyard, just outside the village of Duthil, Inverness-shire.

References

External links 
 

1817 births
1888 deaths
Earls of Seafield
Members of the Parliament of the United Kingdom for Scottish constituencies
UK MPs 1868–1874
UK MPs who inherited peerages
UK MPs who were granted peerages
Scottish Tory MPs (pre-1912)
Grant, James Ogilvy-Grant, 8th Lord
Peers of the United Kingdom created by Queen Victoria